Om Kumar is an Indian politician and he is a member of the 18th Legislative Assembly and has earlier been part of the 17th Legislative Assembly and 16th Assembly of Uttar Pradesh India. He represents the Nehtaur constituency of Uttar Pradesh and is a member of the Bharatiya Janata Party political party.

Early life and education
Om Kumar was born in Bijnor district, Uttar Pradesh. He received education till twelfth grade. Om Kumar belongs to the SC category and belongs to the chamar community. Before being elected as MLA, he used to work as a businessperson.

Political career
Om Kumar has been a MLA for three-terms. He represents the Nehtaur constituency and is a member of the Bhartiya Janta Party political party.

in 2017 elections, he defeated his close Indian National Congress candidate Munnalal Premi by a margin of 23,151 votes.

in 2022 elections, he defeated his close Rashtriya Lok Dal candidate Munsi Ram by a margin of 258 votes.

Posts Held

See also
Nehtaur
Uttar Pradesh Legislative Assembly
Government of India
Politics of India
Bahujan Samaj Party

References 

1969 births
Living people
Bahujan Samaj Party politicians from Uttar Pradesh
People from Bijnor district
Uttar Pradesh MLAs 2012–2017
Uttar Pradesh MLAs 2017–2022
Uttar Pradesh MLAs 2022–2027
Bharatiya Janata Party politicians from Uttar Pradesh